Zak Ibsen (born June 2, 1972) is an American retired soccer player.

Career
Ibsen played college soccer at UCLA.  He was a member of the 1992 U.S. Olympic team and the U.S. National Team.  He played in Germany and in the National Professional Soccer League for the Baltimore Spirit as a midfielder before he was traded to the Tampa Bay Terror on January 17, 1996 in exchange for John Garvey. He then joined Major League Soccer in 1996. Selected by New England in the 1996 MLS Supplemental Draft, he also later played for Dallas, Chicago, Los Angeles and San Jose. He won MLS titles with the Chicago Fire in 1998 and the San Jose Earthquakes in 2001. During his MLS career Ibsen played in 140 games, scored 6 goals, and had 10 assists. His most notable assist came during MLS Cup 2001, in which he assisted Dwayne De Rosario's game winning goal for the Earthquakes.

Long active in beach soccer, Ibsen played for the United States national beach soccer team at the FIFA Beach Soccer World Cup in 2006 and 2007.

Personal life 
His professional soccer career ended due to a crystal meth addiction which left him homeless.

References

External links

1972 births
Living people
American expatriate soccer players
American soccer players
American Professional Soccer League players
Baltimore Spirit players
California Jaguars players
Chicago Fire FC players
FC Dallas players
Hawaii Tsunami players
LA Galaxy players
Los Angeles Salsa players
Major League Soccer players
National Professional Soccer League (1984–2001) players
New England Revolution players
Soccer players from California
Tampa Bay Terror players
San Jose Earthquakes players
VfL Bochum II players
FC Rot-Weiß Erfurt players
Olympic soccer players of the United States
Footballers at the 1992 Summer Olympics
UCLA Bruins men's soccer players
United States men's international soccer players
United States men's under-23 international soccer players
USL Second Division players
A-League (1995–2004) players
New England Revolution draft picks
Association football defenders
American beach soccer players